Ntcheu is a town located in the Central Region of Malawi. It is the administrative capital of Ntcheu District.
Ntcheu is known for its produce, including Irish potatoes.

Demographics

References

Populated places in Central Region, Malawi